was a Japanese politician. He was the last mayor of Yono, Saitama.

After graduating from the University of Tokyo, Ihara joined Niigata Engineering in 1950. He was appointed as treasurer of Yono in April 1979.

Ihara won in the mayoral election held in April 1983, succeeding Saburō Shiratori, who had governed Yono for 24 years. He served as mayor for 18 years until the city of Yono was dissolved to form the city of Saitama on 1 May 2001. He also served as acting mayor of Saitama until Sōichi Aikawa was elected as its first mayor on 27 May 2001. Ihara did not run in the mayoral election to maintain neutrality.

Ihara died of pneumonia at age 80. A statue of him was built at the ward office of Chūō to honor him in 2008.

Honors
 Order of the Sacred Treasure, 3rd Class

References

Mayors of places in Saitama Prefecture
People from Saitama (city)
University of Tokyo alumni
1926 births
2007 deaths
Deaths from pneumonia in Japan